Kimberley Jerray-Silver (born 10 June 1977) is a former English international footballer. She was a full–time professional player with Fulham, whom she joined from Arsenal.

Football career

Club
Jerray-Silver won the 1995–96 FA Women's Premier League Cup with Wembley Ladies. In the final against Doncaster Belles, she came on as a second-half substitute. The game finished 2–2 before Wembley won on penalties.

International
In May 1996 Jerray-Silver won a solitary England cap in a 3–0 Euro qualifying win over Portugal at Griffin Park.

Personal life
Jerray-Silver became a firefighter and was among the first on the scene at Edgware Road during the 7 July 2005 London bombings.

References

External links
 

1977 births
Living people
English women's footballers
England women's international footballers
FA Women's National League players
Arsenal W.F.C. players
Fulham L.F.C. players
Barnet F.C. Ladies players
Women's association football midfielders
London Fire Brigade personnel